The Ontario Blues are the senior men's representative rugby team for Ontario. They were founded in 2009 to compete in the Americas Rugby Championship against other representative teams from Canada, Argentina, and the United States. In their inaugural season, the Blues suffered narrow losses against British Columbia and the Wolf Pack before defeating the Rock to advance to the Canadian Final. The Blues would again lose to BC, but defeated the U.S. Selects in the bronze medal match. 

In 2010, Rugby Canada changed the format of the Canadian competition of the ARC, introducing the CRC.  The four Canadian teams which competed in the ARC stayed the same, but now played in the CRC, with a Canadian Selects team being chosen from CRC players, and that selects team going on to represent Canada at the ARC. The Blues went on to win four straight Canadian Rugby Championships from 2011 to 2014 during a stretch where they were 19 wins and one loss over three seasons. The Blues have since won the MacTier Cup in 2016 and 2018.

Teams 
In 2017, Rugby Ontario announced that their entire provincial rugby program would be branded under the name "Ontario Blues", replacing the "Ontario Storm" name which had been used for the women's team. The Ontario Blues name now encompasses all provincial representative teams of Rugby Ontario. This includes age-grade competition (U15-U18), development squads (U19 Men's and U20 Women's).

The Ontario Arrows are a privately funded elite club, which is closely related to the Blues organization, that is in negotiations to join the professional Major League Rugby for the 2019 season.  The club will play exhibition games in 2018 at York Lions Stadium.

Season Records

Americas Rugby Championship

Canadian Rugby Championship

Honours

 Canadian Rugby Championship
 Champions: 6 (2011, 2012, 2013, 2014, 2016, 2018)

Current squad
Squad for the 2018 Canadian Rugby Championship season.

Props
 Rob Brouwer
 Djustice Sears-Duru
 Ryan Surgenor
 Pat Lynott
 Doug Wooldridge

Hookers
 Eric Howard
 Andrew Quattrin
 Hank McQueen

Locks
 Mike Sheppard
 Paul Ciulini
 Kolby Francis

Flankers
 Andrew Wilson
 Josh van Horne
 Jeremy Wright
 Seb Pearson
 Marcello Wainwright

No 8
 Lucas Rumball
 Peter Milazzo

Scrum Halves
 Andrew Ferguson
 Mario van der Westhuizen
 Riley di Nardo

Fly Halves
 Shawn Windsor
 Kieron Martin
 Roman Cao-Riquelme

Centres
 Jamie Leveridge
 Dan Moor
 Andrew Coe
 Alex Colborne
 Jon West

Wingers
 Josh Campbell
 John Sheridan
 Kainoa Lloyd

Fullbacks
 Rory McDonnell
 Mitch Richardson
 Lucas Hammond

Notable players

Canada

The following players have represented Canada at full international level.

 Tyler Ardron
 Stu Ault
 Ray Barkwill
 Brett Beukeboom
 Rob Brouwer
 Aaron Carpenter
 Paul Ciulini
 Alistair Clark
 Andrew Coe
 Derek Daypuck
 Tom Dolezel
 Andrew Ferguson
 Eric Howard
 Kainoa Lloyd
 Jamie Mackenzie
 Phil Mackenzie
 Mark MacSween
 Rory McDonell
 Ander Monro
 John Moonlight
 Dan Moor
 Taylor Paris
 Dan Pletch
 Mike Pletch
 Lucas Rumball
 Mike Scholz
 Djustice Sears-Duru
 Mike Sheppard
 Matt Tierney
 Liam Underwood
 Andrew Wilson
 Jordan Wilson-Ross
 Doug Wooldridge

Games played against international opposition

References

External links
 Rugby Ontario website
 ARC website

 
Rugby teams in Toronto
Canadian Rugby Championship